Thirst is the second studio album by English post-punk band Clock DVA. It was released on 24 January 1981, through record label Fetish. Soon after the album's release, this incarnation of the band would split up, with several members going on to form The Box with singer Peter Hope.

Background 
Thirst is one of the group's more experimental efforts, showcasing a mix of post-punk, jazz, musique concrète and avant-garde industrial experimentation.

Track listing

Release 

Thirst topped the NME Indie Charts upon its release.

Charts

Personnel 
Adapted from the Thirst liner notes.

Clock DVA
 Adi Newton – vocals, clarinet, tape, production
 Turner (Steven James Turner) – bass guitar
 Roger Quail – drums
 Paul Widger – guitar
 Charlie Collins – saxophone, flute

Production and additional personnel
 Ken Thomas – engineering, production
 Jonz – mastering
 Genesis P-Orridge – album liner notes
 Neville Brody – sleeve design

Release history

References

External links 
 

1981 albums
Clock DVA albums